Karakuri may refer to:

Karakuri (manga), a manga by Masashi Kishimoto
Karakuri puppet, Japanese 18th/19th century mechanized puppet or automaton